Lucas Cranach the Younger (October 4, 1515 – January 25, 1586) was a German Renaissance painter and portraitist, the son of Lucas Cranach the Elder and brother of Hans Cranach.

Life and career
Lucas Cranach the Younger was born in Wittenberg, Germany on October 4, 1515, the second son of Lucas Cranach the Elder and Barbara Brengebier. He began his career as a painter as an apprentice in his father's workshop, training alongside his older brother, Hans. Following the sudden death of Hans in 1537, Cranach the Younger would assume greater responsibilities in his father's workshop. 

The Protestant Reformation began in Wittenberg in 1517. Cranach the Elder was friends with Martin Luther and became known as a leading producer of Protestant artistic propaganda. In 1550, Cranach the Elder left Wittenberg to join his patron, John Frederick I, Elector of Saxony, in exile. Following his father's departure, Cranach the Younger assumed full responsibility over the flourishing family workshop. In this position, he successfully maintained the workshop's high output of quality work, including images of Reformers such as Luther himself. Although Cranach the Younger was never a court painter, he worked for members of the social elite, including princes and nobles. Upon his death in 1586, theologian Georg Mylius (1613–1640) stated that Cranach the Younger's work could be seen in "churches and schools, in castles and houses."

The Cranach family enjoyed a high status in Wittenberg. In addition to the painting workshop, Cranach the Younger was a successful businessman and politician. He occupied several political offices in Nuremberg commencing in 1549, when he served on the city council. He also served as Chamberlain, beginning in 1555 and Burgomaster from 1565.

On February 20, 1541, he married Barbara Brück (daughter of Gregor Brück, who was Luther's legal advisor and Cranach's neighbour in Wittenberg), with whom he had three sons and a daughter. He was also connected to the Brück family by his sister, Barbara Cranach, who married Christian Brück (brother of his wife). Barbara Cranach died of plague on February 10, 1550. Soon after, Cranach married Magdalena Schurff on May 24, 1551. This union produced five children, including painter Augustin Cranach. His daughter Elisabeth married Polykarp Leyser the Elder.

Cranach the Younger died in Wittenberg on January 25, 1586, at the age of 70. He is buried adjacent to one of his finest altarpieces in the church of St Mary, also known as Stadtkirche Wittenberg.

Works

The Family of Sigismund I of Poland

References

External links

 Cranach Digital Archive (cda) The research resource on Lucas Cranach
 Fifteenth- to eighteenth-century European paintings: France, Central Europe, the Netherlands, Spain, and Great Britain, a collection catalog fully available online as a PDF, which contains material on Cranach the Younger (cat. no. 10)

16th-century German painters
German male painters
German Renaissance painters
German Lutherans
People from Wittenberg
People from the Electorate of Saxony
Cranach family
1515 births
1586 deaths